Salvador "Salva" Iriarte Montejo (born 2 April 1952) is a Spanish retired footballer who played as a midfielder, and was later a manager.

Career
Iriarte played in La Liga with Real Sociedad for several seasons after graduating from their youth system and spending a long period with the club's reserve team, but was unable to establish himself in the side. He was a barely-used squad member when La Real were league champions in 1981 and 1982, and at the end of the latter season he retired from playing to become a coach, aged 30. 

Iriarte's managerial career was also closely associated with Real Sociedad, serving as assistant coach and then taking charge of the senior side for most of the 1994–95 season and the first part of 1995–96 (departing after a weak start in the league and a Copa del Rey elimination by lower-division CD Numancia) between two spells managing the B-team in the third tier. He also spent time as assistant manager of the Wales national team under John Toshack, having worked with him in the same role at Real Sociedad.

Personal life
Iriarte's son Gaizka was also a footballer, who appeared for their hometown club SD Beasain, but never reached the professional level.

Honours
La Liga: 1980–81, 1981–82

External links

1952 births
Living people
People from Beasain
Spanish footballers
Footballers from the Basque Country (autonomous community)
Association football midfielders
La Liga players
Tercera División players
Real Sociedad B footballers
Real Sociedad footballers
Spanish football managers
Segunda División managers
La Liga managers
Real Sociedad B managers
Real Sociedad managers
Real Sociedad non-playing staff
Sportspeople from Gipuzkoa